Aza (until 2003, Yuxarı Aza, Jukhary Aza, Yukary-Aza, and Yukhary Aza «Upper Aza») is a village and municipality in the Ordubad District of Nakhchivan, Azerbaijan. It is located in the left side of the Ordubad-Nakhchivan highway, 17 km in the south-east from the district center, on the right bank of the Gilanchay River. Its population is busy with gardening, vegetable-growing, farming, animal husbandry. There are secondary school, club and a medical center in the village. It has a population of 442.

Etymology
The former name of the village, Yuxarı (Upper) Aza means "Aza village which located in the upper side". Since 2003, the name of the village is officially registered as Aza. At the various sources, this settlement is described as a small town in versions of Aza, Azar, Azat, Azad. In the location of the same city is now located, two villages of Aza and Azadkand.

Monuments 
There was a ruinous Armenian church located on a hill to the west of the village. The ruins of the church were completely destroyed by April 26, 2004.

There was an Armenian cemetery located on the eastern edge of the village. The cemetery consisted of 240–250 tombstones. The cemetery was destroyed by April 26, 2004.

See also 
Church of Yukhari Aza

References

External links

See also
 Azadkend — formerly, Aşağı Aza

Populated places in Ordubad District